The 2016 Montana Democratic presidential primary  was held on June 7 in the U.S. state of Montana as one of the Democratic Party's primaries ahead of the 2016 presidential election.

The Democratic Party's primaries in California, New Jersey, New Mexico and South Dakota were held the same day, as were Republican primaries in the same five states, including their own Montana primary. Additionally, the Democratic Party held North Dakota caucuses the same day.

Opinion polling

Results

Analysis
Heading into the final batch of primaries on June 7, Montana was generally seen as a state Bernie Sanders would win, being largely whiter and more rural and less densely populated than the country at-large. Sanders has also generally performed well in the Pacific Northwest. Having put Barack Obama over the top mathematically in its Democratic Primary in 2008, Montana again voted against Hillary Clinton in 2016.

While Clinton won in the cities of Great Falls and Billings (where she had dispatched her husband earlier that month), Sanders won in Helena and Missoula and swept most of the rural counties of the state. However, that same day Clinton won large victories in California, New Jersey, New Mexico, and South Dakota and was able to claim the Democratic nomination.

References

Montana
Democratic primary
2016